Until the Ribbon Breaks (often abbreviated to UTRB), is a British band consisting of the frontman Pete Lawrie-Winfield (lead vocals, keyboards, programming, percussion, brass, guitar) and Elliot Wall (drums, programming, backing vocals). The band was founded in Cardiff, Wales in 2012, initially as Lawrie-Winfield's solo project and "blends genres like electronic, pop, rock, and hip-hop, but it’s all done with a sharp alternative edge".

History

2012: Founding
The group began as the solo project of Pete Lawrie Winfield, from Cardiff, Wales. Both his parents were musicians, and Winfield grew up to listening to artists such as Marvin Gaye, Stevie Wonder, and Elton John. Winfield went to school to study film, but found he preferred music after he started making soundtracks for his own movies. He has stated, "Until The Ribbon Breaks started as a concept I had for one record. Ribbon being film or a cassette tape as the whole thing was based around this idea of the combination of music and film. At the time I made it I didn't know how far I was going to go with it."

2013: Early releases

Pitchfork Media stated on 20 June 2013, Until the Ribbon Breaks' early single "Pressure" "was written during a period when Winfield was sleeping on the floor of his studio with no concrete plan for his career". For the music video, Winfield combined scenes from David Lynch's 1997 thriller Lost Highway, stating; "Lost Highway seemed like the perfect match visually for the mood I was trying to convey...The film feels willfully claustrophobic and always on the verge of losing any sense of continuity."

With the track "2025", released in June 2013, Pitchfork writes that Winfield "manages to paint a starkly provocative picture of emotional decay, exhaling his vocals with a painfully resigned rasp circled by lurching drum machines, deflating synths, and industrial clanging. '2025' is a beautiful dirge, a bleak track kept barely afloat by an aching, human sadness".

Winfield soon recruited James Gordon and Elliot Wall to join the band. To create their debut album, the band "buried themselves in a hidden studio space armed with just a film projector, a microphone, a drum machine, and a piano". The trio would project films without sound on the studio walls while working, with Winfield stating "I’d shut the sound off, watch the movies, and make music to them. It was everything from David Lynch to Terrence Malick”.

The band finished their first tour of North America in 2013, in support of Lorde, and also finished a five-date tour across the United States with Phantogram that year. Spin named the Until The Ribbon Breaks one of the Best 5 Artist of the Month for June 2013. As of 2013, they released remixes of The Weeknd's "Wicked Games," Sam Smith's "Nirvana," and Lorde's "Royals." UTRB was featured on Run the Jewels' "Job Well Done" in 2013.

2014–Present: Recent projects

In 2014, the band released a remix of "Sights" by London Grammar, in which an accompanying music video was also released, being composed of cut-up clips from films that inspired the re-imagination. Vogue called the remix "a starker, slimmer version of the original that transforms the spirit of it into something slightly more eerie". In June 2014, the band performed at Electric Forest Festival in Michigan. The band opened for London Grammar throughout January 2015, after releasing their debut full-length album, A Lesson Unlearnt, in January 2015.

On 3 November 2015, it was announced through the band's Facebook page that member James Gordon would be leaving the band to focus on new ventures.

On 26 January 2018, the band was featured on a video by the YouTube social experiment channel 'Yes Theory' regarding past alcoholism. 
 
On 23 February 2018, Until the Ribbon Breaks released its second studio album called Until the Ribbon Breaks.

Style

The band "blends genres like electronic, pop, rock, and hip-hop, but it’s all done with a sharp alternative edge," and Pitchfork Media has called Until the Ribbon Breaks "avant-R&B savants". The band often writes music in front of a projector, with Winfield stating; "For me, it just allows my mind to wander further than the confines of where it normally would. Silent moving images of nature, space, a busy street, whatever it maybe, take on a new sense of gravitas when soundtracked and vice versa. The music is given meaning by the image". Winfield has also stated that, "Lyrics, to me, are the most essential part of writing music. I always start with the music, and depending on how I feel and what mood the music is conveying, that gives me an idea of what kind of thing I should be saying over it".

Members
Current lineup
Pete Lawrie-Winfield – lead vocals, keys, programming, percussion, brass and guitar (2012–present)
Elliot Wall – drums, programming, backing vocals (2013–present)

Past members
James Gordon – keys, percussion, programming, backing vocals, bass (2013–2015)

Discography

Albums
A Lesson Unlearnt (2015)
Until the Ribbon Breaks (2018)

Singles

Remixes
"King and Lionheart (Until the Ribbon Breaks Remix)" by Of Monsters and Men
"Addicted to Love (Until the Ribbon Breaks Remix)" by Robert Palmer
2012: "Primadonna (Until the Ribbon Breaks Remix)" by Marina and the Diamonds
2012: "Wicked Games (Until the Ribbon Breaks Remix)" by The Weeknd
2013: "Nirvana (Until the Ribbon Breaks Remix)" by Sam Smith
2013: "Closer (Until the Ribbon Breaks Remix)" by Tegan and Sara
2014: "Sights (Until the Ribbon Breaks Remix)"" by London Grammar
2014: "Royals (Until the Ribbon Breaks Remix)" by Lorde
2014: "Fall in LOVE (Until the Ribbon Breaks Remix)" by Phantogram
2014: "She (Until the Ribbon Breaks Remix)" by Laura Mvula
Soundtrack appearances

• Stalker – Their cover of Blondie's "One Way or Another" appears in the TV show Stalker with a darker and fitting tune for the episode.

• Greys Anatomy – In Season 10 Episode  10, their song "Romeo" plays in the dying minutes of the episode.

• The Magicians – In Season 3 Episode  13, their song "One Way or Another" plays in the last moments of the episode.

Guest appearances

Further reading
Interviews

Discographies
Until the Ribbon Breaks at AllMusic
Until the Ribbon Breaks at Discogs

References

External links

 
 Until the Ribbon Breaks on YouTube
 Until the Ribbon Breaks on VEVO
 Until the Ribbon Breaks on SoundCloud

British alternative rock groups
Republic Records artists